Ranieri Carenza (born 4 February 1963) is an Italian male former long-distance runner who competed at five editions of the IAAF World Cross Country Championships at senior level (from 1983 to 1988). He won one national championships at senior level (1987).

Achievements

References

External links
 

1963 births
Living people
Italian male long-distance runners